The 1st Troop Carrier Group (Provisional) was a United States Air Force unit that fought in the Korean War. The unit was attached to Far East Air Forces' Fifth Air Force.

Operational Units: (August 1950 – January 1951)
 46th Troop Carrier Squadron (P)
 47th Troop Carrier Squadron (P)
 48th Troop Carrier Squadron (P)

1st TCG was organized at Ashiya Air Base, Japan on 26 August 1950 under operational control of FEAF through the 1st Troop Carrier Task Force (Provisional). The 1st TCG and its provisional squadrons were based at Tachikawa and supported by the 374th Troop Carrier Wing. Personnel from units of Thirteenth and Twentieth Air Forces and the Far East Air Materiel Command (FEAMCOM) manned the 1st TCG. Using C-46s and briefly C-47s, the group began airlifting freight and passengers between Japan and Korea on 2 September 1950. The group transported a U.S. Marine unit to Pyongyang on 25 and 26 November, then flew emergency air evacuations from Sinanju and other forward bases as the Chinese advanced. Leaving Kimpo AB on 4 January, the group inactivated effective 25 January, with many of its personnel transferring to the 86th Troop Carrier Squadron of the 437th TCG. In its five months of operation, the group carried over 28,000 passengers, 7,000 air evacuees, and almost 12,000 tons of cargo.

Stations:
 Tachikawa AB, Japan (August 1950 – January 1951)

Aircraft Flown:
 Curtiss C-46 Commando
 Douglas C-47 Skytrain

See also
 United States Air Force In South Korea

References

 Futrell, Robert Frank (1983) The United States Air Force in Korea, 1950–1953, Maxwell AFB, Alabama Office of Air Force History, 
 Maurer, Maurer (1983). Air Force Combat Units of World War II. Maxwell AFB, Alabama: Office of Air Force History. .
 Ravenstein, Charles A. (1984). Air Force Combat Wings Lineage and Honors Histories 1947–1977. Maxwell *  Air Force Historical Research Agency

External links

Military units and formations established in 1950
United States Air Force units and formations in the Korean War
001